The Tri-County Veterans Bridge located in Tennessee, carries Tennessee State Route 60 over Chickamauga Lake on the Tennessee River. It connects Meigs and Rhea counties just north of Hamilton County. It is located just south of the confluence of the Tennessee and Hiwassee River as well as Hiwassee Island near descending river mile 500. It replaced Blythe Ferry upon its completion in 1994.

See also
 List of crossings of the Tennessee River

References

Bridges over the Tennessee River
Buildings and structures in Hamilton County, Tennessee
Road bridges in Tennessee
Transportation in Hamilton County, Tennessee
Bridges completed in 1994
Transportation in Rhea County, Tennessee
Tennessee State Route 60
1994 establishments in Tennessee
Transportation in Meigs County, Tennessee